Allerton railway station was a railway station on the City Line of the Merseyrail network, located in the suburbs of Liverpool, England.

History
It opened on 15 February 1864 with the opening of the St Helens and Runcorn Gap Railway's extension to Edge Hill.

Despite the name, it was not located in the suburb of Allerton, but in neighbouring Garston. The station was located at the Allerton Junction of the routes from Liverpool to Manchester and Crewe.

Prior to closure, the station was served by the hourly Liverpool Lime Street to Manchester Oxford Road service. A stopping service to Crewe ran for many years, but was withdrawn in the early 1990s.

Allerton lost much of its traffic in 1978 when the nearby Garston station reopened on Merseyrail's Northern Line, offering a faster, more frequent service to Liverpool Central.

Despite the low passenger numbers, the station retained a staffed booking office - open all day when trains were running - in accordance with the policy of the local PTE, Merseytravel.

Closure
The station closed to passengers on 30 July 2005 and underwent a complete rebuild, reopening on 11 June 2006 as Liverpool South Parkway. The original station buildings were demolished, and the subway linking the platforms, located at the Liverpool end of the station was filled in. A new, modern structure of glass and steel was built, with a footbridge over the platforms at the south end of the station.

See also
Allerton Junction
Allerton TMD depot

References

 
 

Disused railway stations in Liverpool
Former London and North Western Railway stations
Railway stations in Great Britain opened in 1864
Railway stations in Great Britain closed in 2005